There are currently fourteen legislative buildings in Canada: Parliament in Ottawa, and one for each of the provinces and territories of Canada, though not all contain the words legislative building in their names.

Current

Former 
Bonsecours Market, Montreal, United Province of Canada, (1849)
Colonial Building, St. John's, Colony of Newfoundland (1850–1907), Dominion of Newfoundland (1907–1949), Province of Newfoundland (1949–1959)
First Ontario Parliament Buildings, Toronto, Upper Canada (1832–1841), United Province of Canada (intermittently 1849–1859), Ontario (1867–1893)
Navy Hall, Niagara-on-the-Lake, Upper Canada (1792–1796)
 Episcopal Palace, Quebec City, Province of Quebec (1777–1791), Lower Canada (1791–1840), United Province of Canada (1850–1853)
 Old Parliament Building (Quebec), Quebec City, United Province of Canada (1853–1854)
 Canadian Museum of Nature, Ottawa, federal Parliament (1916–19)
 Kingston General Hospital, Kingston, United Province of Canada, (1841-1844)

See also 
 Burning of the Parliament Buildings in Montreal (1849)

References

 
Lists of buildings and structures in Canada